Sils Lake may refer to:

Lake Sils  in the Upper Engadine valley, Grisons, Switzerland  
Lake Sils, an ancient lake located in Catalonia, Spain